Thargelia was a renowned hetaera in ancient Greece who is said to have been married fourteen times.

According to Plutarch, she was born in Ionia and "made her onslaughts upon the most influential men" of her times. Thargelia was noted for her physical beauty and was endowed with grace of manners as well as clever wits. Plutarch asserts that Thargelia "attached all her consorts to the King of Persia" and sought for the spreading of Persian sympathy in the cities of Greece by means of her clients, "who were men of the greatest power and influence". She is said to have lived for a long time in Thessaly, where she successfully propagandized the Persian policy.

Citations 

Hetairai
Ancient Thessalian women
Ancient Anatolian Greeks
Greek female prostitutes
Medism
Ancient Greeks in Thessaly